The Breed is a 2006 natural horror film that is directed by Nicholas Mastandrea. Having marked Mastandrea's directorial debut, the film features two brothers and their friends who travel to an island cabin the brothers inherited from their recently deceased uncle for a relaxing weekend getaway. However, the group is besieged by ravenous genetically enhanced dogs bred to kill via an abandoned training facility on the Island.

Plot
A couple on a small sailboat find a small island and begin to look around. The woman wanders off while the man ties up the boat. She stumbles across a fence and a small compound, but no one seems to be around. She is then attacked by unknown creatures. The man at the boat is startled by her screams.

Sometime later, a seaplane heads to what appears to be the same island. Matt (Lively) and John (Hudson) are two brothers who are heading to the island for a week of fun and relaxation. The island was owned by their uncle, who built a cabin on it. He recently died, and the island is otherwise uninhabited. The brothers are joined by three friends, Nicki (Rodriguez), Sara (Manning) and Noah (Harper). Upon landing, they moor the seaplane at a dock near the cabin.

Soon after they arrive, a puppy shows up. The friends take him in to the cabin. Noah goes into the kitchen to get a drink. The puppy follows him in. The puppy then mysteriously growls at him and runs off. Sara and John then follow him out. They are ambushed by an older vicious dog and Sara is bitten by it. The pair manage to get back to the cabin.

The following morning, the men are in the forest. They bump into the man who came to the island at the beginning of the movie. He is bloody and warns them about the dogs. A pack of dogs attack and eat him. The men run back to the cabin and tell the women to come inside. A dog attacks Nicki and John shoots an arrow to save her, wanting to kill a dog, but accidentally impales one through of Nicki's shin instead. They are soon under siege by more vicious dogs, one of which they impale with a hot-poker.

The friends decide they must leave the island, but dogs have surrounded the plane. As they have no other way off the island, and no means of communication, they will have to wait out the dogs. However, a few minutes later, they see the plane has detached from its moorings and is drifting toward the ocean; the dogs have chewed through the ropes to force the friends out of the cabin. When John attempts to swim to the plane, the dogs are on the plane and they go after him. However, he manages to swim to the dock, then the friends retreat to the house. Sara begins to show distinct canine behavior, such as a ravenous appetite and growling.

Their next idea is to make their way to a storage shed and drive their uncle's car to the training compound, where they believe they can call for help. However, the car won't start and that night, with no other options, they continue to party. The power goes out, and Noah heads to the fuse box in the basement which also contains a stock of vintage wine, where he is killed by dogs who have managed to enter the house. The dogs then find their way into the rest of the cabin, and Matt is bitten. John, Matt, Nicki, and Sara have to hide in the attic. There, they discover paperwork relating to the training facility, and learn it was an Army facility to train attack dogs.

The next morning, the dogs have left. Matt and John make another attempt and manage to pop the clutch of their uncle's Mercedes-Benz. They go back to pick up the women, but Sara does not want to leave. The dogs attack her again, and in fighting one, Sara falls out of the window and impales herself and the dog on a post.

Matt, John, and Nicki drive to the facility and find it abandoned. They break in and discover that the dogs were being genetically enhanced. John finds communications equipment, but a power cable on the antenna has been disconnected, so he goes out to fix it. Having been bitten and infected, Matt learns he can sense the dogs, and realizes if they escaped they can get back in. When the antenna is powered up, John is accidentally shocked by electricity, and when he falls to the ground the dogs attack him. Matt shows up with a baseball bat to fight off the dogs, but a power surge has caused a fire in the compound. Nicki realizes the fire is creating a backdraft, and lures in the dogs before exposing them to the fire. The building then explodes, killing all the dogs inside.

John tells Matt that he saw a nearby boat, which was owned by the couple from beginning of the film. When the dogs surround the brothers, the dogs do not appear hostile and almost look accepting. Before anything can happen, Nicki shows up in the Mercedes, the brothers jump in and drive off. Because there are so many dogs, they cannot stop the car and get out, so John has Nicki drive the car off the pier. They swim to the boat and sail off. Thinking they are safe, they wonder if they can make it to medical facilities before Matt and John fall victim to the dog bites and become feral-minded like the dogs. In the last shot, they open the door to the sleeping quarters, and a stowaway dog leaps out.

Cast
 Michelle Rodriguez as Nicki
 Oliver Hudson as John
 Taryn Manning as Sara
 Eric Lively as Matt
 Hill Harper as Noah
 Nick Boraine as Luke
 Lisa-Marie Schneider as Jenny

Production

This film is Nick Mastandrea's debut as a director. Mastandrea had been recruited by Wes Craven to direct the movie after Mastandrea served as Craven's first assistant director for the film Wes Craven's New Nightmare (1994). Each actor had almost a week of dog training before filming began. Production started in April 2005 and finished about two months later.

Reception

The Breed earned an approval rating of 15% on Rotten Tomatoes.

References

External links
 
 
 The Breed (2006) Movie Review at beyondhollywood.com

2006 films
2006 horror films
American natural horror films
German horror films
South African horror films
Films about brothers
Films about death
Films about dogs
Films set on islands
2006 directorial debut films
2000s English-language films
2000s American films
2000s German films